Taisha Airport  is an airport serving the town of Taisha in Morona-Santiago Province, Ecuador.

The Taisha non-directional beacon (ident: TSH) is just south of the field.

See also

 List of airports in Ecuador
 Transport in Ecuador

References

External links
 HERE Maps - Taisha
 OpenStreetMap - Taisha
 OurAirports - Taisha
 Taisha

Airports in Ecuador